A referendum on the approval of the Catalan Statute of Autonomy was held in Catalonia on Sunday, 2 August 1931. Voters were asked whether they ratified a proposed draft Statute of Autonomy of Catalonia, also known as the "Statute of Núria". Article 12 of the Spanish Constitution of 1931 allowed for Spanish provinces to be organized into "autonomous regions", provided that a regional Statute was proposed by a majority of the provinces' municipalities comprising at least two-thirds of the provincial population and that two-thirds majority of all those eligible to vote accepted the draft Statute.

The referendum resulted in 99.5% of valid votes in support of the draft Statute on a turnout of 75.3%, representing 74.8% of the electorate. The draft Statute was subsequently submitted to the consideration of the Spanish Cortes, which finally approved it on 9 September 1932 with a 314–24 result.

Results

See also
1933 Basque Statute of Autonomy referendum
1936 Galician Statute of Autonomy referendum

References

1931 referendums
1931 in Catalonia
Referendums in Catalonia
August 1931 events